Muhammad Faiz Iqbal Fardhani (born 11 January 2002) is an Indonesian professional footballer who plays as a midfielder for Liga 2 club Deltras, on loan from Arema.

Club career

Arema
He was signed for Arema to play in Liga 1 in the 2021 season. Faiz made his first-team debut on 23 November 2021 as a substitute in a match against Barito Putera.

Deltras (loan)
On 2 August 2022, Faiz joined Liga 2 club Deltras on loan.

Career statistics

Club

Notes

Honours

Club
Arema
Indonesia President's Cup: 2022

References

External links
 Muhammad Faiz at Soccerway
 Muhammad Faiz at Liga Indonesia

2002 births
Living people
Sportspeople from Malang
Sportspeople from East Java
Indonesian footballers
Liga 1 (Indonesia) players
Liga 2 (Indonesia) players
Arema F.C. players
Deltras F.C. players
Association football midfielders